The Burniston Range is a mountain range of the Boundary Ranges in northwestern British Columbia, Canada, located on the northeast side of Portland Canal and north of the Ashington Range.

References

Boundary Ranges
Mountain ranges of British Columbia